Manuela Zehnder (born 8 May 1983 in Aadorf) is a professional squash player who represented Switzerland. She reached a career-high world ranking of World No. 95 in March 2002.

References

External links 

Swiss female squash players
Living people
1983 births
Sportspeople from Thurgau